Old Smyrna is the modern name for the remains of Smyrna before the town moved to its later place at Smyrna, modern Izmir. The ruins lie near Bayraklı, that was once a village, but is now part of Izmir. Old Smyrna was once close to the sea, but is now some hundred meters apart from it. The ancient Greek town was inhabited from about 1000 to 300 BC. There are some earlier remains too. Around 300 BC, people left the place and moved to Smyrna, about 4 km far away.

The remains are well known from several excavations. It is one of very few ancient Greek towns whose development can be traced for over 700 years. According to ancient sources, Smyrna was founded by Aeolians, but later conquered by Colophon and was therefore regarded as Ionian city. Around 600 BC, the city was conquered by Alyattes of Lydia and became part of the Lydian empire. 545 BC the city became part of the Achaemenid Empire. Around 330 BC, people left the place and moved 4 km apart from it.

Archaeological excavations started 1930/31 under Franz Miltner. From 1948 to 1951 British-Turkish exacavations were guided under the direction of John Manuel Cook and Ekrem Akurgal. Since 1967 there are further Turkish excavations.
The archaeological excavations discovered a heavily destroyed temple for Athena, a massive town wall and several parts of the living quarters. Next to the town are also substantial ancient cemeteries.

Excavation reports 
 Ekrem Akurgal: Alt-Smyrna I. Wohnschichten und Athenatempel. Türk Tarih Kurumu, Ankara 1983
 John M. Cook, R. V. Nicholls: The Temples of Athena, Old Smyrna Excavations. London 1998, ISBN 0904887286
 J. M. Cook: Old Smyrna, 1948–1951. In: The Annual of the British School at Athens 53/54, 1958/1959, S. 1–34.
 R. V. Nicholls: The Iron Age Fortifications and Associated Remains on the City Perimeter, in: The Annual of the British School at Athens, 53/54 (1958/1959), S. 35-137.

References 

Ancient Smyrna